Harvey Smith Peeler Jr. (born September 8, 1948) is an American politician. He is a member of the South Carolina Senate, representing the 14th District from since 1980, initially as a Democrat, and from October 1989, as a Republican. He was the Senate Majority Leader from 2005 to 2016 and president of the senate from 2019 to 2021. In 2021, he became Chair of the Finance Committee after the death of Hugh Leatherman.

Early life and career
He was born on September 8, 1948 in Gaffney, South Carolina. He received a Bachelor of Science from Clemson University in 1970. He served as a lieutenant in the United States Army from 1970 to 1972.

He is a dairyman.

Political career
He has served as a  state senator for South Carolina since 1981. Peeler became Senate Majority Leader in 2005 after the resignation of Hugh Leatherman. He resigned as Majority Leader in 2016. In Peeler's first year in the state senate, he formed a voting bloc with Hugh Leatherman. In 1989, he was one of five Democratic South Carolina legislators to switch to the Republican Party from the Democratic.

He has served as chairman of the Senate Medical Affairs Committee since 2001, and vice-chairman of the Senate Finance Committee since 2007. He is the brother of former South Carolina Lieutenant Governor Bob Peeler.

Confederate flag controversy
In 2015, after the shooting at the Emanuel African Methodist Episcopal Church in Charleston, which killed fellow State Senator Clementa C. Pinckney, Peeler voted against removing the Confederate flag. Peeler compared removing it to "removing a tattoo from the corpse of a loved one and thinking that that would change the loved one's obituary". He was one of only three state senators to vote against its removal, the other two being Danny Verdin and Lee Bright. Fifteen years earlier, Peeler was one of only seven senators who voted against the flag's removal from the top of the South Carolina Capitol Dome and both chambers of the South Carolina Legislature to its present position on the capitol grounds, arguing that the flag's removal would only worsen race relations. The 2000 vote was a compromise between anti- and pro-flag forces in the wake of an economic boycott of the state.

Personal life
He married Ila LaDonna Caudill on August 8, 1969, and they have three children: Brantlee Rene, Harvey Smith III, and Boone Solomon. He attends Gaffney First Baptist Church. He is a Mason and a Shriner.

He is a member of the American Jersey Cattle Association and the American Legion.

Notes

References

External links
Follow the Money – Harvey S. Peeler Jr.
2006 2004 2002 2000 campaign contributions

|-

|-

|-

|-

|-

1948 births
21st-century American politicians
American Freemasons
Clemson University alumni
Dairy farmers
Living people
People from Gaffney, South Carolina
Republican Party South Carolina state senators